Madge Stewart is a former Jamaican woman cricketer. Madge Stewart made her international debut for Jamaica in 1973 at the 1973 Women's Cricket World Cup. In a match as a part of the 1973 Women's Cricket World Cup, she delivered a memorable spell of 4/9 against Young England women's cricket team which helped Jamaica to win that match by 23 runs.

Her international career was halted in 1973 with playing for Jamaica in 4 WODIs.

References

External links 
 

Living people
Jamaican women cricketers
Date of birth missing (living people)
Place of birth missing (living people)
Year of birth missing (living people)